Gadi Brumer (born 5 November 1973) is a former Israeli professional footballer who played for Maccabi Tel Aviv.

Career
Brumer (who played at centre-back and sweeper positions), is notable for playing his entire career for Maccabi Tel Aviv (see List of one-club men), and was famous not only for his intelligence in defence, but also for his fighting spirit and his commitment, having often played whilst injured.

Brumer was summoned to a trial with Manchester United in June 1996, thus becoming the first and only Israeli to be on trial with the club. Though he was good in the trial, Manchester preferred Norwegian Ronny Johnsen. Brumer was offered contracts from other teams in the Premier League, but decided to hold out for a big club which never happened and Brumer continued with his home club.

Honours
Israeli championships (3):
1994–95, 1995–96, 2002–03
Israel State Cup (4):
1994, 1996, 2001, 2002
Toto Cup (1):
1998–99

Personal life
Gadi's twin brother Alon was a midfielder and both played together in Maccabi Tel Aviv for 9 seasons.

References

External links

1973 births
Living people
Israeli Jews
Israeli footballers
Maccabi Tel Aviv F.C. players
Association football defenders
Israel international footballers
Israeli twins
Twin sportspeople